Kue leker is a type of Indonesian crepe, made with wheat flour, eggs, milk and sugar.

Ingredients and cooking method 
The crepe is served with various fillings, such as banana, sugar, condensed milk, cheese and chocolate sprinkles. The crepe is folded in half prior to serving. The texture of kue leker is akin to the crepe; thin and crispy.

Origin

The name "Leker" comes from the Dutch word Lekker, meaning "tasty". It is believed the origin of this snack is from Solo during the Dutch colonial period.

See also

 Kue ape
 Kue cucur
 Kue
 Serabi
 Terang bulan

References 

Indonesian pancakes